The 2002 Konica V8 Supercar Series was an Australian touring car series held for V8 Supercars. It was the third series held for second tier V8 Supercar teams. The series began on 31 March 2002 at Wakefield Park and finished on 4 August at Mallala Motor Sport Park having been contested over five rounds held across three different states.

The series was dominated by Paul Dumbrell who won twelve races during the course of the 15 race series. Dumbrell finished 484 points clear of the only other driver to win more than one race, Dale Brede.

Teams and drivers
The following teams and drivers competed in the 2002 Konica V8 Supercar Series.

Race calendar

Points system
The season consisted of five rounds across three different states. Each round consisted of three races. Points were awarded for the first 32 positions at each race
but at no race during the series did more than 22 cars finish. The third race of a race weekend carried approximately 50% more points than each of the first two races.

Series standings 
Points table referenced, in part, as follows:

See also
2002 V8 Supercar season

References

External links
Race Results - Wakefield Park, www.v8supercars.com, as archived at web.archive.org 
2002 Racing Results Archive
2002 Konica V8 Supercar Series points, www.v8supercars.com, as archived at web.archive.org
Image of Series winner Paul Dumbrell (Holden VX Commodore), www.v8supercars.com, as archived at web.archive.org

Konica
Supercars Development Series